Emamzadeh Abbas (also Romanized as Emāmzādeh ‘Abbās; also known as Emāmzādeh and Emāmzādeh ‘Abbās‘alī) is a village in Hojr Rural District, in the Central District of Sahneh County, Kermanshah Province, Iran. At the 2006 census, its population was 19, in 4 families.

References 

Populated places in Sahneh County